Arbovirus is a shortened name given to viruses that are transmitted by arthropods, or arthropod-borne viruses.

Arbovirus may also refer to:

 Arbovirus (band), Bangladeshi alternative rock band
 Arbovirus encephalitis, encephalitis diseases caused by an arbovirus infection

de:Arbovirus
es:Arbovirus
fr:Arbovirus
it:Arbovirus
nl:Arbovirus